Havergal College is an independent day and boarding school for girls from Junior Kindergarten to Grade 12 in Toronto, Ontario, Canada. The school was established in 1894 and named for Frances Ridley Havergal, a composer, author and humanitarian.

Today, the  campus is located at 1451 Avenue Road, at the corner of Avenue Road and Lawrence Avenue in midtown Toronto. Facilities include an Upper School, an athletic centre with a pool and fitness center, music studios, a theatre, computer labs and a Junior School.

In 2012, Havergal's elementary school was ranked first by the Fraser Institute amongst Toronto schools, receiving a "perfect score of 10". In 2015, Havergal's secondary school was ranked second by the Fraser Institute amongst 749 Ontario secondary schools.

History

Havergal was founded in 1894 as a Church of England Ladies' College, under principal Ellen Mary Knox. She held a first-class in the final honour examination at the University of Oxford, a Cambridge University diploma in teaching, and a First Division Government certificate. Havergal was the sister school of Ridley College for the first several decades of the schools' history.

In 1898, a new building was constructed for the school at 354 Jarvis Street. By 1903, Havergal College had 120 boarders and 200 day girls, a staff of 20 resident teachers (chiefly from English universities) and a number of nonresident visiting teachers. The former Havergal Ladies' College building at 354 Jarvis Street is now the Margaret McCain Academic Building at the National Ballet School of Canada.

Symbols

Havergal has several symbols. The Havergal Crest, comprising maple leaves, laurel branches, a torch, and a lamp of learning, symbolizes the school motto of Vitai Lampada Tradens — passing on the torch of life. The marguerite was chosen as the school flower "because it grew so cheerily wherever its luck found it, and because it looked up so steadily at the light that its heart was pierced with purest gold, its petals the purest white." (First Principal Ellen Knox)

Havergal College's official mascot is the HaverGator, an alligator dressed in the Havergal school uniform. The HaverGator, known as "Allie Gator" amongst Havergal students, represents the Havergal Athletics program and school spirit.

Upper School (US)
The Upper School refers to both the Middle School and the Senior School (together, grades 7 to 12) and is located at 1451 Avenue Road. The building was completed in 1926.

Upper School curriculum
The Liberal Arts program exceeds the expectations of the Ontario Ministry of Education.  All courses are college-preparatory and are at the advanced level.  A credit is granted with the successful completion of a course for which a minimum of 110 hours has been scheduled.  Many students choose to write Advanced Placement exams. Upon graduation, students receive the Ontario Secondary School Diploma.

Languages
The Languages Department at Havergal offers courses in French, Spanish, Latin, and Mandarin.

Technological education
Students learn the fundamentals of web design, video and multimedia production, animation, and graphic design. Courses provide the opportunity to explore current industry-standard software, including PhotoShop, InDesign, GoLive, Final Cut Pro, DVD Studio Pro, Soundtrack, LiveType, Motion, Dreamweaver, Flash, and Microsoft Office.

Advanced Placement
The Advanced Placement (AP) Program gives students exposure to university-level material and, in some cases, credit towards university courses, and helps students acquire the skills and habits they will need for success at university. Havergal offers Advanced Placement courses in biology, calculus, statistics, French, seminar, and research.

Boarding school
The boarding school is a residence for approximately 50 students (Grades 9 to 12), representing countries all over the globe. Fully integrated in the life of the school and with Day Students, boarding students participate in life skills programming, recreational programming and The Duke of Edinburgh's Award, in addition to the curricular and co-curricular programs. The Boarding School also hosts exchange students who visit for several weeks each term from partner schools located in six countries worldwide.

Bullying controversy 
In May 2020, the school was the defendant in a lawsuit filed by a student of the school and her mother alleging 'relentless' bullying, both digitally and in person, that the school did not prevent, seeking $38 million in damages.

This is not the first time the school has been the subject of lawsuits about failing to prevent bullying, with a $5.5 million lawsuit filed in November 2019 after the school allegedly expelled the victim in question, following her parents complaints. A report by York University psychology professor Debra Pepler found bullying to be a "significant, systemic problem" at the school (the report was commissioned by the victim's father). As part of the latter case, allegations of racism were made (the victim in question is of Asian heritage).

Notable alumnae

Gillian Apps 2001 – Canadian women's hockey team; 2006, 2010, & 2014 Olympic gold medallist
Carolyn Bennett 1968 – Liberal MP and federal Minister of Crown-Indigenous Relations (2015-Present)
Rachel Blanchard 1994 – actress
Lois Butler 1913 - Olympic skier, aviator and one of the first women pilots of the Air Transport Auxiliary.
Paula Cox 1976 — Premier of Bermuda
Eileen de Villa – Chief Medical Officer of Health of Toronto
Frances Drake – actress of the 1930s
Frieda Fraser – physician
Linda Frum 1981 – journalist, Canadian Senator of Ontario
Faith Goldy – far-right political commentator
Margot Kidder 1966 – actress
Margaret McCain 1951 – 27th Lieutenant-Governor of New Brunswick
Dora Mavor Moore 1899 – Canadian theatre pioneer
Claire Mowat - writer and environmentalist
Lana Ogilvie 1986 – model, businesswoman
Alexandra Orlando 2005 – rhythmic gymnast and Olympian
Indrani Pal-Chaudhuri 1992 — model, director, and photographer
Quinn 2013 – Canadian Women's soccer Olympic gold medalist (2021)
Kate Reid 1949 – actress
Georgina Reilly 1986 – actress
Sarah Richardson 1989 – Canadian interior designer
Susan Swan 1963 - author, journalist, performance artist, and professor of creative writing
Mariko Tamaki 1993 — writer of graphic novels
Jane Urquhart 1967 – author
Kristina Valjas 2005 — Canadian women's beach volleyball (Olympian)

Notable faculty
Mabel Allington Royds, English woodcut artist
Ann Peel – director of the Institute at Havergal
Bryon Wilfert – Honorary Consul for the Republic of the Union of Myanmar, Former Liberal MP.

House system
The house system forms the basis for organization in the school. The Houses have been named for women who have contributed to the welfare of Havergal.

The house tradition is a characteristic of the Havergal community is part of the history of the school. The House system recognizes the contributions of ten women within the life of the school, it also provides an important link between students and Old Girls throughout the generations.

Affiliations
Canadian Accredited Independent Schools (CAIS)
Conference of Independent Schools (CIS)
The Association of Boarding Schools (TABS)
National Association of Independent Schools (NAIS)
CIS eLearning Consortium (CISELC)
Conference of Independent Schools Athletics Association (CISAA)

References

External links

Girls' schools in Canada
Boarding schools in Ontario
High schools in Toronto
Private schools in Toronto
Anglican schools in Canada
Educational institutions established in 1894
1894 establishments in Ontario